The IEEE International Carnahan Conference on Security Technology (ICCST) is an annual IEEE conference related to security technology, with a particular focus on physical security, biometrics, information security, threat detection, and cyber security.

The 55th Annual International Carnahan Conference on Security Technology, originally scheduled for 2–4 September 2020, was postponed to 1–3 September 2021.

The conference is named after the Carnahan House, a conference center at the University of Kentucky located in Lexington, Kentucky, USA. The initial conferences were held at this location, hosted by the Lexington Chapter of the IEEE.

Previous conference locations

References

Security technology